Behran Oil Company (Shirkat-e Nuft-e Behran) is an oil refining  company with headquarters in Tehran. Its products are exported to more than 40 countries.

History and development
Behran Oil Company was founded in 1963 as a private joint venture with Exxon Mobil Company in Iran. The first products of the company were just packing and blending engine oils. The company became independent after the Islamic Revolution. Gradually it was expanded and now the production rate reaches 250,000 tons of base oil for each year, as well as 350,000 tons per year of finished products. In total, the capacity of the company for the production of finished products is more than 500,000 tons per year, meanwhile the quality of the products have been upgraded according to the appropriate advanced international standards and guidelines.

It has a 40-43% share of the motor oil market and a 30% share of the industrial lubricant market in Iran. The company also exports about $40 million in finished lubricants, rubber process oils and paraffin waxes to more than 30 countries.

Behran Oil Company has been progressively increased its commitment in the field of lubricant production technology through considerable investment in research and development. The development of Behran activities resulted in the establishment of a new plant for the production of special lubricants and antifreezes.

Behran Oil in numbers

Number of employees: 500

Number of employees in outsourcing facilities: 500

Annual sales: $500million

Production capacity of base oil (Group I): 250,000 tons / year

Production capacity of finished products (engine oils and industrial oils) :400,000 tons / year

Market share in engine oils : 45%

Market share in industrial oils: 30%

Annual exports : $40million

Products
The main products of the company are Automotive lubricating oils, Industrial lubricants, Petroleum waxes, Antifreeze – Antiboil and Anticorrosion, Rubber process oils, Fuel additives and Greases.

Certifications
Behran Oil Company has qualified for ISO 9001 from SGS, as well as many other health, safety, and environment certificates including ISO 14001 and OHSAS 18001.

See also

Industry of Iran
Privatization in Iran
List of Iranian companies
National Iranian Oil Company

References

External links
 
 Behran Trading co.
 Bloomberg Businessweek

Oil and gas companies of Iran
Oil refineries in Iran
Energy companies established in 1963
Non-renewable resource companies established in 1963
Companies listed on the Tehran Stock Exchange
Iranian brands
Iranian companies established in 1963
Iranian entities subject to the U.S. Department of the Treasury sanctions